Šipan, also known as Sipano is the largest of the Elaphiti Islands. Two limestone crests, the higher (Velji Vrh, 243 m) in the northeast and the lower in the southeast surround a dolomite depression, on which olives, figs, vine, carob-trees, almond-trees, oranges and citrus fruit are cultivated.

The island's population is 419 (2011). There are two ports on the island, Suđurađ (San Giorgio) in the east, and Šipanska Luka (Porto Gippana) in the west. The island is also famed for its numerous palm tree species that grow on the island.

It is the likely location of the naval Battle of Tauris during Caesar's Civil War.

It was first mentioned by this name in documents of 1371.

In 1426 it became part of the Republic of Ragusa.

During the French Revolutionary Wars, the British Royal Navy referred to it as Zupano. On 17 June 1813 a landing party of marines and seamen from  captured the French garrison.

Gallery

See also 
 Elaphiti Islands

References

Bibliography

External links 
 

 
Islands of Croatia
Islands of the Adriatic Sea
Landforms of Dubrovnik-Neretva County